Painter Run (also known as Painter's Run) is a tributary of West Branch Fishing Creek in Sullivan County, Pennsylvania, in the United States. It has one named tributary, which is known as Oxhorn Run and one unnamed tributary. Painter Run is slightly acidic, with pH values ranging from 5.99 to 6.88. The stream is in a narrow valley with several ridges nearby. Sandstone of the Pocono Formation occurs near it. At least two bridges have been constructed over the stream. Its unnamed tributary is considered to be Class A Wild Trout Waters.

Course

Painter Run begins in a small pond in a shallow valley in Davidson Township. It flows southeast for a few tenths of a mile and receives an unnamed tributary from the right. It then turns east for several tenths of a mile and its valley becomes deeper and narrower. The stream gradually turns south and receives an unnamed tributary from the left. After several tenths of a miles, it receives another unnamed tributary from the right. The stream then turns southeast for some distance and its valley continues to become deeper. It then receives another unnamed tributary from the left and turns southeast for approximately a mile, flowing alongside State Route 2003. It then gradually turns south-southeast and receives its only named tributary, Oxhorn Run, from the right. Several tenths of a mile further downstream, it reaches its confluence with West Branch Fishing Creek.

Tributaries
Painter Run has one named tributary, which is known as Oxhorn Run. It also has one unnamed tributary.

Hydrology
Between June 2010 and April 2011, the water temperature of Painter Run was measured four times. The specific conductance of the stream's waters was 37, 21, 15, and 20 micro-siemens per centimeter, respectively.

Between June 2010 and April 2011, the pH of Painter Run was measured four times. The lowest pH was 5.99 on January 4, 2011 and the highest pH was 6.88 on June 18, 2010. The pH of the stream was 6.598 on November 13, 2010 and 6.20 on April 9, 2011.

Painter Run is designated by the Pennsylvania Department of Environmental Protection for use for aquatic life. It attains the Pennsylvania Department of Environmental Protection's standards. However, its tributary Oxhorn Run does not meet the standards and is considered by the Pennsylvania Department of Environmental Protection to be impaired.

Geography and geology

Painter Run is in a narrow valley between two mountains. There is also a ridge to the north of the stream. Another ridge lies between the stream and West Branch Fishing Creek.

Sandstone of the Pocono Formation occurs near the headwaters of Painter Run. In most of the stream's valley, alluvium, alluvial terrace, alluvial fan, and a glacial till known as the Wisconsinan Till can be found. The Wisconsinan Bouldery Till occurs on the eastern side of the stream's valley in its lower reaches. Bedrock consisting of sandstone and shale can also be found in the vicinity of the stream.

During the Wisconsinan Glaciation, tongues of ice flowed northwest up Painter Run.

Watershed
The stream is entirely within the United States Geological Survey quadrangle of Elk Grove.

An unnamed tributary of Painter Run is considered by the Pennsylvania Fish and Boat Commission to be Class A Wild Trout Waters from its source to its mouth. The headwaters of Painter Run are in a pond.

History
Painter Run was entered into the Geographic Names Information System on August 2, 1979. Its identifier in the Geographic Names Information System is 1183207.

In 1864, it was alleged that an organization known as the Fishing Creek Confederacy constructed a fort in the upper reaches of the Fishing Creek watershed. The supposed remains of the fort are in the vicinity of Painter Run. Approximately a thousand soldiers searched the watersheds of East Branch Fishing Creek and West Branch Fishing Creek for deserters and any sign of a fort. However, they were unable to find any evidence of a fort and returned to Bloomsburg, Pennsylvania.

A steel stringer/multi-beam or girder bridge was constructed over Painter Run in 1930. The latter bridge was listed as structurally deficient by 2012. In June 2012, there were plans to repair it in early July 2012.

See also
 Bloody Run (West Branch Fishing Creek), next tributary of West Branch Fishing Creek going downstream
 Big Run (West Branch Fishing Creek), next tributary of West Branch Fishing Creek going upstream
 List of tributaries of Fishing Creek (North Branch Susquehanna River)

References

External links

Rivers of Sullivan County, Pennsylvania
Tributaries of Fishing Creek (North Branch Susquehanna River)
Rivers of Pennsylvania